The Louisa was an American merchant ship that gained fame in 1800 while sailing as a privateer out of Philadelphia, Pennsylvania, during the Quasi-War with France. 

The owners of the Louisa obtained a letter of marque that authorized her captain to act against French merchant shipping during the war. She was armed with twelve 6-pounder guns and carried a crew of thirty sailors and officers.

In August 1800 several French privateers that sailed out of Algeciras, in southern Spain, attacked her off Gibraltar. Her captain, Thomas Hoggard (or Thomas Haggard), was wounded and taken below to his cabin. After Louisa repelled the attack, Hoggard was taken ashore at Gibraltar, where he subsequently died.

The  was named in honor of the bravery of Louisas captain and crew in the action off Gibraltar.

See also
 Famous privateers

Citations and references
Citations

References

Abbot, Willis J. (illustrations, Ray Brown). American Merchant Ships and Sailors. New York: Dodd, Mead & Company (1902).
Hall, John E. (editor).  "Recollections of a Voyage to Italy in the year 1800." The Port Folio and New-York Monthly Magazine, II-3 (September 1822) 207–236. Philadelphia: Harrison Hall (1822).
Maclay, Edgar Stantan. A History of the United States Navy, from 1775 to 1894. New York: D. Appleton and Company (1895).
Pennsylvania Magazine of History and Biography, The Vol. XXIII. Philadelphia:  Historical Society of Pennsylvania (1899).

Quasi-War ships of the United States
Age of Sail merchant ships of the United States
Louisa